Parviz Sobirov (born 12 November 1980) is a Tajikistani judoka.

Parviz finished in joint fifth place in the middleweight (90 kg) division at the 2006 Asian Games. He lost to Hiroshi Izumi of Japan in the bronze medal match.

Born in Temurmalik District, he currently resides in Dushanbe.

External links
2006 Asian Games profile

External links

1980 births
Living people
People from Khatlon Region
Tajikistani male judoka
Judoka at the 2012 Summer Olympics
Olympic judoka of Tajikistan
Judoka at the 2006 Asian Games
Asian Games competitors for Tajikistan
20th-century Tajikistani people
21st-century Tajikistani people